"Dance with You (Nachna Tere Naal)" is the debut single of Rishi Rich Project, which consisted of Jay Sean, Juggy D, and Rishi Rich. Produced by Rich, the song was released on 8 September 2003 and peaked at number 12 on the UK Singles Charts. It was later included on Sean's debut album, Me Against Myself (2004), and on Rich's album Rishi Rich Project.

Background
The lyrics are in both English and Punjabi, with Sean singing the English lyrics and Juggy singing the Punjabi lyrics.

Music video
The music video for the song features Sean, Juggy and Rich setting up a block party in a London neighbourhood. In a small scene, the British Asian football freestyler Abbas Farid is also featured juggling with a soccer ball.

Track listings
UK CD and 12-inch single
 "Dance with You (Nachna Tere Naal)" (original version)
 "Dance with You (Nachna Tere Naal)" (dancehall Diwali remix)

UK 12-inch single (Wayne Wonder remixes)
A. "Dance with You (Nachna Tere Naal)" (Relentless remix)
B. "Dance with You (Nachna Tere Naal)" (Joe Bongo refix)

Charts

References

2003 songs
2003 debut singles
Jay Sean songs
Relentless Records singles
Songs written by Jay Sean